The Sphingomonadales are an order of the Alphaproteobacteria.

Phylogeny
The currently accepted taxonomy is based on the List of Prokaryotic names with Standing in Nomenclature and the phylogeny is based on whole-genome sequences.

References 

Sphingomonadales
Bacteria orders
Alphaproteobacteria